Unicar Cesena is an Italian women's basketball team from Cesena. Unicar Cesena has won Euroleague Women in the 1990-91 season and one Italian Championships.

Titles
 1 Euroleague Women (1991)
 1 Italian Championships (1990)

References

Women's basketball teams in Italy
EuroLeague Women clubs
Cesena